Donald Nathaniel Boyce (born September 2, 1973) is an American former professional basketball player who currently works as head coach for Proviso East High School in Maywood, Illinois. He played college basketball at the University of Colorado.

Early life
Boyce played high school at Proviso East in Maywood, Illinois, along with future NBA draft picks Michael Finley and Sherrell Ford. Boyce played collegiately at the University of Colorado, finishing his career in 1995 as the Buffaloes' all-time leading scorer (until Richard Roby surpassed him in 2008).

In September 1993, Boyce was arrested for allegedly taking part in a drug deal outside a fast-food restaurant in Boulder, Colorado. Boyce stated he never took or used drugs.

Professional career
Boyce was selected with the 13th pick in the 2nd round of the 1995 NBA Draft by the Atlanta Hawks for whom he played for parts of two seasons from 1996 to 1997, averaging 2.6 points in 30 total games. Boyce's final NBA game was on February 19, 1997 in a 100 - 87 win over the Indiana Pacers where he played for 4 minutes and recorded no stats.

On an 11-year career, Boyce played in the CBA and USBL and also had playing stints in Argentina and France.

Career statistics

NBA

Regular season

|-
| align="left" | 1995–96
| align="left" | Atlanta
| 8 || 0 || 5.1 || .391 || .500 || .500 || 1.3 || 0.4 || 0.4 || 0.1 || 3.0
|-
| align="left" | 1996–97
| align="left" | Atlanta
| 22 || 2 || 7.0 || .333 || .125 || .500 || 0.7 || 0.6 || 0.5 || 0.2 || 2.5
|- class="sortbottom"
| style="text-align:center;" colspan="2"| Career
| 30 || 2 || 6.5 || .349 || .250 || .500 || 0.8 || 0.5 || 0.4 || 0.2 || 2.6
|}

Playoffs

|-
| align="left" | 1995–96
| align="left" | Atlanta
| 1 || 0 || 2.0 || .000 || .000 || .000 || 0.0 || 0.0 || 0.0 || 0.0 || 0.0
|}

College

|-
| align="left" | 1991–92
| align="left" | Colorado
| 28 || 28 || 33.5 || .419 || .278 || .564 || 4.8 || 3.1 || 2.4 || 1.0 || 14.9
|-
| align="left" | 1992–93
| align="left" | Colorado
| 27 || 24 || 33.2 || .455 || .315 || .639 || 6.2 || 3.6 || 1.9 || 0.7 || 19.1
|-
| align="left" | 1993–94
| align="left" | Colorado
| 26 || 26 || 34.3 || .401 || .317 || .708 || 6.7 || 4.5 || 2.3 || 1.5 || 22.4
|-
| align="left" | 1994–95
| align="left" | Colorado
| 26 || 26 || 30.8 || .409 || .316 || .706 || 6.5 || 4.1 || 2.5 || 1.1 || 18.5
|- class="sortbottom"
| style="text-align:center;" colspan="2"| Career
| 107 || 104 || 33.0 || .421 || .308 || .666 || 6.0 || 3.8 || 2.3 || 1.1 || 18.6
|}

Coaching career
Boyce began his coaching career in 2011 with his alma-mater, Proviso East. His team finished with a 32–1 record in 2011–12 and a 29–5 record in 2012–13, losing both times in the IHSA tournament to the Jabari Parker-led Simeon Wolverines (in the state title game in the former year, and the state semi-final in the latter.) 

On October 19, 2015, Boyce was hired by the Texas Legends of the NBA Development League to work as an assistant coach.

Boyce was reinstated as Proviso East Head Coach at the beginning of March 2016.

References

External links
College & NBA stats @ databasebasketball.com
College Stats

1973 births
Living people
African-American basketball players
Albany Patroons players
American expatriate basketball people in Argentina
American expatriate basketball people in France
American men's basketball players
Atlanta Hawks draft picks
Atlanta Hawks players
Basketball players from Chicago
Colorado Buffaloes men's basketball players
Harlem Globetrotters players
High school basketball coaches in Illinois
Limoges CSP players
Shooting guards
Yakima Sun Kings players
21st-century African-American sportspeople
20th-century African-American sportspeople